Frozen Silence is a 2012 Spanish-Lithuanian war-time mystery thriller directed by Gerardo Herrero which stars Juan Diego Botto as inspector Arturo Andrade and Carmelo Gómez as a fascist fellow Blue Division member, with both investigating a series of killings in the midst of the Winter in the eastern theatre of World War II. The screenplay by Nicolás Saad is an adaptation of Ignacio del Valle's novel El tiempo de los emperadores extraños.

Plot 
Eastern Front of World War II. Winter of 1943. The discovery of the corpse of a soldier with an blood inscription on the chest made with a knife (the start of a series or ritual killings) near Leningrad haunts a battalion of the Blue Division, the unit dispatched by the Francoist dictatorship to help Nazi Germany against the Soviet Union in World War II. Private Arturo Andrade (a former police inspector and someone with a shrouded past suggested to be damning from an ideological standpoint) and fascist sergeant Espinosa team up to crack the mystery, which turns up to be related to a Masonic lodge in Valencia. The film ends with the beginning of the Battle of Krasny Bor.

Cast

Production 
Written by Nicolás Saad, the screenplay is an adaptation of  El tiempo de los emperadores extraños, part of a tetralogy of novels featuring inspector Arturo Andrade. A Spanish-Lithuanian co-production, the film was produced by Tornasol Films, Castafiore Films, Foresta Films, Zebra Producciones, and Lietuvos kino studija. Shooting locations included Alicante's Ciudad de la Luz as well as Lithuania.

Release 
Distributed by Alta Classics, the film was theatrically released in Spain on 20 January 2012. While it managed to enter as the fourth highest-grossing film at the Spanish box office in its opening weekend (albeit with a modest €195,000), it underperformed throughout its theatrical run, grossing €406,843 (against a €5.2 million budget) and was cited among the Spanish productions with more in-year losses.

Critical reception 
Jonathan Holland of Variety deemed the film to be an "ambitious, multilayered thriller", considering that despite an excess of labored dialogue and elements crammed into some plotlines, the film manages to successfully blend "genre excitement with historical intrigue", otherwise singling it out as the best feature by Herrero since The Galíndez File.

Alfonso Rivera of Cineuropa wrote about the film's atmosphere, "rarefied and marred not only because of the murders that reek of revenge, sadism and depravity, but also the little attachment to life of some soldiers, the internal corruption of the troops, the solitude devoid of feelings that is suffered in such circumstances and the desperate search for answers to something that has no reason to be".

Sergi Sánchez of La Razón gave the film a negative review, considering that the film does not work "because the execution is as flat as an ironing board. Because the dialogues are contrived. [And] Because the performances [except for Sergi Calleja's] are affected".

Irene Crespo of Cinemanía rated the film 3 out of 5 stars, summing it up as a "careful production and interesting thriller in the cold Russian front".

Accolades 

|-
| align = "center" rowspan = "2" | 2012 || rowspan = "2" | 21st Actors and Actresses Union Awards || Best Film Actor in a Secondary Role || Carmelo Gómez ||  || rowspan = "2" | 
|-
| Best Film Actor in a Minor Role || Víctor Clavijo || 
|}

See also 
 List of Spanish films of 2012

References

External links 

2010s Spanish films
2010s Spanish-language films
Eastern Front of World War II films
Spanish crime thriller films
Lithuanian thriller films
2012 crime thriller films
Tornasol Films films
Films directed by Gerardo Herrero
Films shot in Lithuania
Films shot at Ciudad de la Luz
Films set in 1943
Films based on Spanish novels